Fort Massapeag Archeological Site is a historic archaeological site at Sunset Park in Massapequa, New York.  It is believed to be the site of a New Netherland trading post built in the mid-17th century to facilitate trade with local Native Americans, and possibly serve as a wampum factory.  It was first excavated in the 1930s by a team including Ralph Solecki.  It was declared a National Historic Landmark in 1993.

History
In 1656, Peter Stuyvesant, the director of the New Netherland colony (now New York City) signed an agreement with Lenape chief Tackapausha, which included a provision that the Dutch would construct "A howse or A forte" for trade with Natives residing on Long Island.  Ralph Solecki, a professional archaeologist with a long interest in this site, believes this site to be the fortified trading post that was then built.  The trading post remained in operation until the Dutch turned New Netherland over to the British in 1664, and the land was sold by the Lenape to English settlers in 1694.

The area has long been known as "Fort Neck", and many people believed the remnant fortifications to be of Native construction, and possibly the site of a conflict between the English and Natives.  The area came to the attention of archaeologists in the 1930s, when the Harbor Green development began, uncovering graves of Native Americans and the site of a village, which was destroyed in the process.  The fort site itself was already well known to local collectors, and was significantly compromised by their activities.  Solecki participated in an early excavation of the site, which formed the basis of his eventual doctoral dissertation.

The site was preserved from development and turned into what is now Sunset Park; a sign commemorating its significance stands near the junction of Fairfax and Gloucester Roads.

See also
List of National Historic Landmarks in New York
National Register of Historic Places listings in Oyster Bay (town), New York

References

Sources

External links
 "A National Landmark Nobody Knows About", by John Rather, May 8 2005, New York Times
   (Accessed September 2, 2007)

National Historic Landmarks in New York (state)
National Register of Historic Places in Oyster Bay (town), New York
Archaeological sites in New York (state)